HMS Andrew (P423/S23/S63), was an  of the Royal Navy, built by Vickers Armstrong and launched on 6 April 1946.

The submarine was fitted with a  deck gun in 1964 for service during the Indonesia–Malaysia confrontation to counter blockade-running junks. The gun was fired for the last time in December 1974. She was sold off in 1977 and was broken up.

Andrew was briefly the oldest Amphion-class submarine to remain in service, was the last British submarine with a deck gun, was the last British World War II-designed submarine in service, and was the first submarine to use a "snort" to cross the Atlantic (in May 1953).

Design
Like all Amphion-class submarines, Andrew had a displacement of  when at the surface and  while submerged. The submarine was powered by two Admiralty ML eight-cylinder diesel engines generating a power of  each. It also contained four electric motors each producing  that drove two shafts.

Andrew was fitted with ten  torpedo tubes, one QF 4 inch naval gun Mk XXIII, one Oerlikon 20 mm cannon, and a .303 British Vickers machine gun. Its torpedo tubes were fitted to the bow and stern, and it could carry twenty torpedoes. Its complement was sixty-one crew members.

Service history
In September 1950 Andrew sailed to Canada for a three-month deployment training with the Royal Canadian Navy. In February 1953, Andrew deployed to Bermuda for training with the Royal Canadian Navy cruiser , destroyer  and minesweeper . In June 1953, Andrew became the first submarine to cross the Atlantic submerged for the entire voyage, leaving Bermuda and arriving on 15 June in the English Channel. During the voyage a diesel engine was damaged and a periscope malfunctioned, however both were repaired while submerged. The submarine had been returning from its deployment with the Royal Canadian Navy.

The submarine was used to portray the fictional United States Navy nuclear-powered submarine USS Sawfish in the 1959 Stanley Kramer film On the Beach.

References

Publications
 

 

Amphion-class submarines
Cold War submarines of the United Kingdom
Ships built in Barrow-in-Furness
1946 ships